323 may refer to:

The year 323 BC
The year 323 AD
The number 323
Area code 323, the North American area code
Mazda 323, the widely used alternative name of the Mazda Familia motorcar
British Rail Class 323, an electric train